Central Region ( Al-Minṭaqat al-Wusṭā) was a municipality of Bahrain in the northern part of the country. Its territory is now in the Central and Northern Governorates.

Former municipalities (regions) of Bahrain